Paroplitis is a genus of braconid wasps in the family Braconidae. There are about five described species in Paroplitis.

Species
These five species belong to the genus Paroplitis:
 Paroplitis beringianus Mason, 1981 (North America)
 Paroplitis luzonicus Mason, 1981 (Philippines)
 Paroplitis rugosus Papp, 1991 (Austria)
 Paroplitis vietnamensis van Achterberg & Fernández-Triana, 2013 (Vietnam)
 Paroplitis wesmaeli (Ruthe, 1860) (Palearctic)

References

Further reading

 
 
 

Microgastrinae